The 2021 Virginia Cavaliers women's soccer team represented the University of Virginia during the 2021 NCAA Division I women's soccer season. The Cavaliers were led by head coach Steve Swanson, in his twenty second season. They played home games at Klöckner Stadium. This was the team's 36th season playing organized women's college soccer and their 34th playing in the Atlantic Coast Conference.

The Cavaliers finished the season 18–3–2 and 8–0–2 in ACC play to finish as regular season champions.  As the top seed in the ACC Tournament they received a bye into the Semifinals.  They defeated Clemson before losing to Florida State in the Final.  They received an at-large bid to the NCAA Tournament and were one of the four number one seeds.  They defeated High Point in the First Round and Milwaukee in the Second Round before losing to BYU in the Sweet 16 to end their season.

Previous season 

Due to the COVID-19 pandemic, the ACC played a reduced schedule in 2020 and the NCAA Tournament was postponed to 2021.

The Cavaliers finished the fall season 8–3–1, 5–2–1 in ACC play to finish in third place. In the ACC Tournament they defeated Louisville in the Quarterfinals before losing to North Carolina in the Semifinals. The Cavaliers finished the spring season 2–1–1 and received an at-large bid to the NCAA Tournament. As an unseeded team, the Cavaliers defeated SIU Edwardsville in the First Round, BYU in the Second Round, Rice in the Third Round, and TCU in the Quarterfinals before losing to Florida State on penalties in the Semifinals.

Squad

Roster

Team management

Source:

Schedule

Source:

|-
!colspan=6 style=""| Exhibition

|-
!colspan=6 style=""| Non-conference Regular season

|-
!colspan=6 style=""| ACC Regular Season

|-
!colspan=6 style=""| ACC Tournament

|-
!colspan=6 style=""| NCAA Tournament

Awards and honors

Rankings

2022 NWSL draft

Source:

References

Virginia
Virginia
2021
Virginia Cavaliers women's soccer
Virginia